The Hindu calendar, Panchanga or Panjika is one of various lunisolar calendars that are traditionally used in the Indian subcontinent and Southeast Asia, with further regional variations for social and Hindu religious purposes. They adopt a similar underlying concept for timekeeping based on sidereal year for solar cycle and adjustment of lunar cycles in every three years, but differ in their relative emphasis to moon cycle or the sun cycle and the names of months and when they consider the New Year to start. Of the various regional calendars, the most studied and known Hindu calendars are the Shalivahana Shaka (Based on the King Shalivahana, also the Indian national calendar) found in the Deccan region of Southern India and the Vikram Samvat (Bikrami) found in Nepal and the North and Central regions of India – both of which emphasize the lunar cycle. Their new year starts in spring. In regions such as Tamil Nadu and Kerala, the solar cycle is emphasized and this is called the Tamil calendar (though Tamil Calendar uses month names like in Hindu Calendar) and Malayalam calendar and these have origins in the second half of the 1st millennium CE. A Hindu calendar is sometimes referred to as Panchangam (पञ्चाङ्गम्), which is also known as Panjika in Eastern India.

The ancient Hindu calendar conceptual design is also found in the Hebrew calendar, the Chinese calendar, and the Babylonian calendar, but different from the Gregorian calendar. Unlike the Gregorian calendar which adds additional days to the month to adjust for the mismatch between twelve lunar cycles (354 lunar days) and nearly 365 solar days, the Hindu calendar maintains the integrity of the lunar month, but inserts an extra full month, once every 32–33 months, to ensure that the festivals and crop-related rituals fall in the appropriate season.

The Hindu calendars have been in use in the Indian subcontinent since Vedic times, and remain in use by the Hindus all over the world, particularly to set Hindu festival dates. Early Buddhist communities of India adopted the ancient Vedic calendar, later Vikrami calendar and then local Buddhist calendars. Buddhist festivals continue to be scheduled according to a lunar system. The Buddhist calendar and the traditional lunisolar calendars of Cambodia, Laos, Myanmar, Sri Lanka and Thailand are also based on an older version of the Hindu calendar. Similarly, the ancient Jain traditions have followed the same lunisolar system as the Hindu calendar for festivals, texts and inscriptions. However, the Buddhist and Jain timekeeping systems have attempted to use the Buddha and the Mahavira's lifetimes as their reference points.

The Hindu calendar is also important to the practice of Hindu astrology and zodiac system. It is also employed for observing the auspicious days of deities and occasions of fasting, such as Ekadashi.

Origins

The Vedic culture developed a sophisticated time keeping methodology and calendars for Vedic rituals, and timekeeping as well as the nature of solar and moon movements are mentioned in Vedic texts. For example, Kaushitaki Brahmana chapter 19.3 mentions the shift in the relative location of the sun towards north for 6 months, and south for 6 months.

Time keeping was important to Vedic rituals, and Jyotisha was the Vedic era field of tracking and predicting the movements of astronomical bodies in order to keep time, in order to fix the day and time of these rituals. This study is one of the six ancient Vedangas, or ancillary science connected with the Vedas – the scriptures of Vedic Sanatan Sanskriti.

Yukio Ohashi states that this Vedanga field developed from actual astronomical studies in ancient Vedic Period. The texts of Vedic Jyotisha sciences were translated into the Chinese language in the 2nd and 3rd centuries CE, and the Rigvedic passages on astronomy are found in the works of Zhu Jiangyan and Zhi Qian. According to Subhash Kak, the beginning of the Hindu calendar was much earlier. He cites Greek historians describing Maurya kings referring to a calendar which originated in 6676 BCE known as Saptarsi calendar.

The Vikrami calendar is named after king Vikramaditya and starts in 57 BCE.

Texts
Hindu scholars kept precise time by observing and calculating the cycles of Surya (the sun), moon and the planets. These calculations about the sun appear in various astronomical texts in Sanskrit, such as the 5th-century Aryabhatiya by Aryabhata, the 6th-century Romaka by Latadeva and Panca Siddhantika by Varahamihira, the 7th-century Khandakhadyaka by Brahmagupta and the 8th-century Sisyadhivrddida by Lalla. These texts present Surya and various planets and estimate the characteristics of the respective planetary motion. Other texts such as Surya Siddhanta dated to have been completed sometime between the 5th century and 10th century present their chapters on various deified planets with stories behind them.

The manuscripts of these texts exist in slightly different versions. They present Surya, planet-based calculations and Surya's relative motion to earth. These vary in their data, suggesting that the text were open and revised over their lives. For example, the 1st millennium CE Hindu scholars calculated the sidereal length of a year as follows, from their astronomical studies, with slightly different results:

The Hindu texts used the lunar cycle for setting months and days, but the solar cycle to set the complete year. This system is similar to the Jewish and Babylonian ancient calendars, creating the same challenge of accounting for the mismatch between the nearly 354 lunar days in twelve months, versus over 365 solar days in a year. They tracked the solar year by observing the entrance and departure of Surya (sun, at sunrise and sunset) in the constellation formed by stars in the sky, which they divided into 12 intervals of 30 degrees each. Like other ancient human cultures, Hindus innovated a number of systems of which intercalary months became most used, that is adding another month every 32.5 months on average. As their calendar keeping and astronomical observations became more sophisticated, the Hindu calendar became more sophisticated with complex rules and greater accuracy.

According to Scott Montgomery, the Siddhanta tradition at the foundation of Hindu calendars predate the Christian era, once had 18 texts of which only 5 have survived into the modern era. These texts provide specific information and formulae on motions of sun, moon and planets, to predict their future relative positions, equinoxes, rise and set, with corrections for prograde, retrograde motions, as well as parallax. These ancient scholars attempted to calculate their time to the accuracy of a truti (29.63 microseconds). In their pursuit of accurate tracking of relative movements of celestial bodies for their calendar, they had computed the mean diameter of the earth, which was very close to the actual 12,742 km (7,918 mi).

Hindu calendars were refined during the Gupta era astronomy by Āryabhaṭa and Varāhamihira in the 5th to 6th century. These, in turn, were based in the astronomical tradition of  Vedāṅga Jyotiṣa, which in the preceding centuries had been standardised in a number of (non-extant) works known as  Sūrya Siddhānta. Regional diversification took place in the medieval period. The astronomical foundations were further developed in the medieval period, notably by Bhāskara II (12th century).

Astrology
Later, the term Jyotisha evolved to include Hindu astrology. The astrological application of the Hindu calendar was a field that likely developed in the centuries after the arrival of Greek astrology with Alexander the Great, because their zodiac signs are nearly identical.

The ancient Hindu texts on Jyotisha only discuss timekeeping, and never mention astrology or prophecy. These ancient texts predominantly cover astronomy, but at a rudimentary level. Later medieval era texts such as the Yavana-jataka and the Siddhanta texts are more astrology-related.

Balinese Hindu calendar
Hinduism and Buddhism were the prominent religions of southeast Asia in the 1st millennium CE, prior to the Islamic conquest that started in the 14th century. The Hindus prevailed in Bali, Indonesia, and they have two types of Hindu calendar. One is a 210-day based Pawukon calendar which likely is a pre-Hindu system, and another is similar to lunisolar calendar system found in South India and it is called the Balinese saka calendar which uses Hindu methodology. The names of month and festivals of Balinese Hindus, for the most part, are different, though the significance and legends have some overlap.

Astronomical basis 

The Hindu calendar is based on a geocentric model of the solar system. A large part of this calendar is defined based on the movement of the sun and the moon around the earth (saura māna and cāndra māna respectively). Furthermore, it includes synodic, sidereal, and tropical elements. Many variants of the Hindu calendar have been created by including and excluding these elements (solar, lunar, lunisolar etc.) and are in use in different parts of India.

Year: Samvat
Samvat refers to era of the several Hindu calendar systems in Nepal and India, in a similar manner to the Christian era. There are several samvat found in historic Buddhist, Hindu and Jaina texts and epigraphy, of which three are most significant: Vikrama era, Old Shaka era and Shaka era of 78 CE.

 Vikram Samvat (Bikram Sambat): A northern Indian almanac which started in 57 BCE, and is also called the Vikrama Era. It is related to the Bikrami calendar, and is apocryphally linked to Vikramaditya. The year starts from the month of Baishakh / Vaishakha. This system is common in epigraphic evidence from northern, western, central and eastern Indian subcontinent, particularly after the early centuries of the 1st millennium CE.
 Shaka Samvat: There are two Shaka era systems in scholarly use, one is called Old Shaka Era, whose epoch is uncertain, probably sometime in the 1st millennium BCE because ancient Buddhist, Jaina and Hindu inscriptions and texts use it. However, the starting point of Old Shaka Era is a subject of dispute among scholars. The second system is called Saka Era of 78 AD, or simply Saka Era, a system that is common in epigraphic evidence from southern India.
 Saka era of Southeast Asia: The Hindu calendar system in Indonesia is attributed to the legend of Hindus arriving with a sage Aji Saka in 1st-century Java, in March 78 CE. Numerous ancient and medieval era texts and inscriptions found in Indonesian islands use this reference year. In mainland southeast Asia, the earliest verifiable use of Hindu Saka methodology in inscriptions is marked Saka 533 in Ankor Borei, which corresponds to 611 CE, while the Kedukan Bukit inscription in Sumatra, containing three dates in Saka 604 (682 CE), is the earliest known use of the Shaka era in the Indonesian islands. However, these inscriptions only set the floruit for the use of the Shaka era in these places, and the Hindu calendar likely existed in southeast Asia before these dates to be used in important monuments. Further, the Hindu calendar system remained popular among the Hindus through to the 15th century, and thereafter in Bali.
 Indian national calendar (modern): combines many Hindu calendars into one official standardized one, but old ones remain in use.

Months

Solar month and seasons

The Hindu calendar divides the zodiac into twelve division called rāśi. The time taken by the Sun to transit through a rāśi is a solar month whose name is identical to the name of the rāśi. In practice, solar months are mostly referred as rāśi (not months).

The solar months are named differently in different regional calendars. While the Malayalam calendar broadly retains the phonetic Sanskrit names, the Bengali and Tamil calendars repurpose the Sanskrit lunar month names (Chaitra, Vaishaka etc.) as follows:
 The Tamil calendar replaces Mesha, Vrisha etc. with Chithirai, Vaigasi etc.
 The Bengali calendar is similar to the Tamil calendar except in that it starts the year with Boiśākh (instead of Choitrô), followed by Jyoisthô etc. The Assamese and Odia calendars too are structured the same way.

The solar months (rāśi) along with their equivalent names in the Bangali, Malayalam and Tamil calendar are given below:

The solar months (rāśi) along with the approximate correspondence to Hindu seasons and Gregorian months are:

The names of the solar months are also used in the Darian calendar for the planet Mars.

Lunar months

Lunar months are defined based on lunar cycles, i.e. the regular occurrence of new moon and full moon and the intervening waxing and waning phases of the moon.

Paksha

A lunar month contains two fortnights called pakṣa (पक्ष, literally "side"). One fortnight is the bright, waxing half where the moon size grows and it ends in the full moon. This is called "Gaura Paksha" or Shukla Paksha. The other half is the darkening, waning fortnight which ends in the new moon. This is called "Vadhya Paksha" or Krishna Paksha. The Hindu festivals typically are either on or the day after the full moon night or the darkest night (amavasya, अमावास्या), except for some associated with Krishna, Durga or Rama. The lunar months of the hot summer and the busy major cropping-related part of the monsoon season typically do not schedule major festivals.

Amanta and Purnimanta systems

Two traditions have been followed in the Indian subcontinent with respect to lunar months: the amanta tradition, which ends the lunar month on new moon day (similar to the Islamic calendar) and the purnimanta tradition, which ends it on full moon day. As a consequence, in the amanta tradition, Shukla paksha precedes Krishna paksha in every lunar month, whereas in the purnimanta tradition, Krishna paksha precedes Shukla paksha in every lunar month. As a result, a Shukla paksha will always belong to the same month in both traditions, whereas a Krishna paksha will always be associated with different (but succeeding) months in each tradition.

The amanta (also known as Amavasyanta or Mukhyamana) tradition is followed by most Indian states that have a peninsular coastline (except Assam, West Bengal, Odisha, Tamil Nadu and Kerala, which use their own solar calendars). These states are Gujarat, Maharashtra, Goa, Karnataka, Andhra Pradesh and Telangana. Nepal and most Indian states north of the Vindhya mountains follow the purnimanta (or Gaunamana) tradition.

The purnimanta tradition was being followed in the Vedic era. It was replaced with the amanta tradition as the Hindu calendar system prior to the 1st century BCE, but the Purnimanta tradition was restored in 57 BCE by Vikramaditya, who wanted to return to the Vedic roots. The presence of this system is one of the factors considered in dating ancient Indian manuscripts and epigraphical evidence that have survived into the modern era.

The two traditions of Amanta and Purnimanta systems have led to alternate ways of dating any festival or event that occurs in a Krishna paksha in the historic Hindu, Buddhist or Jain literature, and contemporary regional literature or festival calendars. For example, the Hindu festival of Maha Shivaratri falls on the fourteenth lunar day of Magha's Krishna paksha in the Amanta system, while the same exact day is expressed as the fourteenth lunar day of Phalguna's Krishna paksha in the Purnimanta system. Both lunisolar calendar systems are equivalent ways of referring to the same date, and they continue to be in use in different regions, though the Purnimanta system is now typically assumed as implied in modern Indology literature if not otherwise specified.

List of Lunar Months 
The names of the Hindu months vary by region. Those Hindu calendars which are based on lunar cycle are generally phonetic variants of each other, while the solar cycle are generally variants of each other too, suggesting that the timekeeping knowledge travelled widely across the Indian subcontinent in ancient times.

During each lunar month, the Sun transits into a sign of the zodicac (sankranti). The lunar month in which the Sun transits into Mesha is named Chaitra and designated as the first month of the lunar year.

A few major calendars are summarized below:

Corrections between lunar and solar months

Twelve Hindu mas (māsa, lunar month) are equal to approximately 354 days, while the length of a sidereal (solar) year is about 365 days. This creates a difference of about eleven days, which is offset every (29.53/10.63) = 2.71 years, or approximately every 32.5 months. Purushottam Maas or Adhik Maas is an extra month that is inserted to keep the lunar and solar calendars aligned. The twelve months are subdivided into six lunar seasons timed with the agriculture cycles, blooming of natural flowers, fall of leaves, and weather. To account for the mismatch between lunar and solar calendar, the Hindu scholars adopted intercalary months, where a particular month just repeated. The choice of this month was not random, but timed to sync back the two calendars to the cycle of agriculture and nature.

The repetition of a month created the problem of scheduling festivals, weddings and other social events without repetition and confusion. This was resolved by declaring one month as Shudha (pure, clean, regular, proper, also called Deva month) and the other Mala or Adhika (extra, unclean and inauspicious, also called Asura masa).

The Hindu mathematicians who calculated the best way to adjust the two years, over long periods of a yuga (era, tables calculating 1000 of years), they determined that the best means to intercalate the months is to time the intercalary months on a 19-year cycle, similar to the Metonic cycle used in the Hebrew calendar. This intercalation is generally adopted in the 3rd, 5th, 8th, 11th, 14th, 16th and 19th year of this cycle. Further, the complex rules rule out the repetition of Mārgasirsa (also called Agrahayana), Pausha and Maagha lunar months. The historic Hindu texts are not consistent on these rules, with competing ideas flourishing in the Hindu culture.

Rare corrections
The Hindu calendar makes further rare adjustments, over a cycle of centuries, where a certain month is considered kshaya month (dropped). This occurs because of the complexity of the relative lunar, solar and earth movements. Underhill (1991) describes this part of Hindu calendar theory: "when the sun is in perigee, and a lunar month being at its longest, if the new moon immediately precedes a samkranti, then the first of the two lunar months is deleted (called nija or kshaya)." This, for example, happened in the year 1 BCE, when there was no new moon between Makara samkranti and Kumbha samkranti, and the month of Pausha was dropped.

Day
Just like months, the Hindu calendar has two measures of a day, one based on the lunar movement and the other on solar. The solar (saura) day or civil day, called divasa, has been what most Hindus traditionally use, is easy and empirical to observe, with or without a clock, and it is defined as the period from one sunrise to another. The lunar day is called tithi, and this is based on complicated measures of lunar movement. A lunar day or tithi may, for example, begin in the middle of an afternoon and end next afternoon. Both these days do not directly correspond to a mathematical measure for a day such as equal 24 hours of a solar year, a fact that the Hindu calendar scholars knew, but the system of divasa was convenient for the general population. The tithi have been the basis for timing rituals and festivals, while divasa for everyday use. The Hindu calendars adjust the mismatch in divasa and tithi, using a methodology similar to the solar and lunar months.

A tithi is technically defined in Vedic texts, states John E. Cort, as "the time required by the combined motions of the sun and moon to increase (in a bright fortnight) or decrease (in a dark fortnight) their relative distance by twelve degrees of the zodiac. These motions are measured using a fixed map of celestial zodiac as reference, and given the elliptical orbits, a duration of a tithi varies between 21.5 and 26 hours, states Cort. However, in the Indian tradition, the general population's practice has been to treat a tithi as a solar day between one sunrise to next.

A lunar month has 30 tithi. The technical standard makes each tithi contain different number of hours, but helps the overall integrity of the calendar. Given the variation in the length of a solar day with seasons, and moon's relative movements, the start and end time for tithi varies over the seasons and over the years, and the tithi adjusted to sync with divasa periodically with intercalation.

Weekday/Vāsara
Vāsara refers to the weekdays in Sanskrit. Also referred to as Vara and used as a suffix. The correspondence between the names of the week in Hindu and other Indo-European calendars are exact. This alignment of names probably took place sometime during the 3rd century CE. The weekday of a Hindu calendar has been symmetrically divided into 60 ghatika, each ghatika (24 minutes) is divided into 60 pala, each pala (24 seconds) is subdivided into 60 vipala, and so on.

The term -vāsara is often realised as vāra or vaar in Sanskrit-derived and influenced languages. There are many variations of the names in the regional languages, mostly using alternate names of the celestial bodies involved.

Five limbs of time
The complete Vedic calendars contain five angas or parts of information: lunar day (tithi), solar day (diwas), asterism (naksatra), planetary joining (yoga) and astronomical period (karanam). This structure gives the calendar the name Panchangam. The first two are discussed above.

Yoga

The Sanskrit word Yoga means "union, joining, attachment", but in astronomical context, this word means latitudinal and longitudinal information. The longitude of the sun and the longitude of the moon are added, and normalised to a value ranging between 0° to 360° (if greater than 360, one subtracts 360). This sum is divided into 27 parts. Each part will now equal 800' (where ' is the symbol of the arcminute which means 1/60 of a degree). These parts are called the yogas. They are labelled:

 Viṣkambha
 Prīti
 Āyuśmān
 Saubhāgya
 Śobhana
 Atigaṇḍa
 Sukarma
 Dhrti
 Śūla
 Gaṇḍa
 Vṛddhi
 Dhruva
 Vyāghatā
 Harṣaṇa
 Vajra
 Siddhi
 Vyatipāta
 Variyas
 Parigha
 Śiva
 Siddha
 Sādhya
 Śubha
 Śukla
 Brahma
 Māhendra
 Vaidhṛti

Again, minor variations may exist. The yoga that is active during sunrise of a day is the prevailing yoga for the day.

Karaṇa
A karaṇa is half of a tithi. To be precise, a karaṇa is the time required for the angular distance between the sun and the moon to increase in steps of 6° starting from 0°. (Compare with the definition of a tithi.)

Since the tithis are 30 in number, and since 1 tithi = 2 karaṇas, therefore one would logically expect there to be 60 karaṇas. But there are only 11 such karaṇas which fill up those slots to accommodate for those 30 tithis. There are actually 4 "fixed" (sthira) karaṇas and 7 "repeating" (cara) karaṇas.

The 4 "fixed" karaṇas are:
 Śakuni (शकुनि)
 Catuṣpāda (चतुष्पाद)
 Nāga (नाग)
 Kiṃstughna (किंस्तुघ्न)

The 7 "repeating" karaṇas are:
 Vava or Bava (बव)
 Valava or Bālava (बालव)
 Kaulava (कौलव)
 Taitila or Taitula (तैतिल)
 Gara or Garaja (गरज)
 Vaṇija (वणिज)
 Viṣṭi (Bhadra) (भद्रा)
 Now the first half of the 1st tithi (of Śukla Pakṣa) is always Kiṃtughna karaṇa. Hence this karaṇa is "fixed".
 Next, the 7-repeating karaṇas repeat eight times to cover the next 56 half-tithis. Thus these are the "repeating" (cara) karaṇas.
 The 3 remaining half-tithis take the remaining "fixed" karaṇas in order. Thus these are also "fixed" (sthira).
 Thus one gets 60 karaṇas from those 11 preset karaṇas.

The Vedic day begins at sunrise. The karaṇa at sunrise of a particular day shall be the prevailing karaṇa for the whole day.
(citation needed )

Nakshatra

Nakshatras are divisions of ecliptic, each 13° 20', starting from 0° Aries.

Festival calendar: Solar and Lunar dates

Many holidays in the Hindu, Buddhist and Jaina traditions are based on the lunar cycles in the lunisolar timekeeping with foundations in the Hindu calendar system. A few holidays, however, are based on the solar cycle, such as the Vaisakhi, Pongal and those associated with Sankranti. The dates of the lunar cycle based festivals vary significantly on the Gregorian calendar and at times by several weeks.The solar cycle based ancient Hindu festivals almost always fall on the same Gregorian date every year and if they vary in an exceptional year, it is by one day.

Regional variants
The Hindu Calendar Reform Committee, appointed in 1952, identified more than thirty well-developed calendars, in use across different parts of India.

Variants include the lunar emphasizing Vikrama, the Shalivahana calendars, as well as the solar emphasizing Tamil calendar and Malayalam calendar. The two calendars most widely used today are the Vikrama calendar, which is in followed in western and northern India and Nepal, the Shalivahana Shaka  calendar which is followed in the Deccan region of India (Comprising present day Indian states of Telangana, Andhra Pradesh, Karnataka, Maharashtra, and Goa).

Lunar
Calendars based on lunar cycle (lunar months in solar year, lunar phase for religious dates and new year):
 Vikram Samvat
 Vikrami era – North and Central India (Lunar)
 Gujarati samvat – Gujarat, Rajasthan
 Sindhi samvat – Sindhis
 Shalivahana calendar (Shaka era) – Used in Deccan region states of Maharashtra, Goa, Karnataka, Andhra Pradesh, Telangana
 Saptarishi era calendar – Kashmiri Pandits
 Nepal Sambat – Nepal, Sikkim
 Meitei calendar – Manipur

Solar
Calendars based on solar cycle (solar months in solar year, lunar phase for religious dates but new year which falls on solar date – South and Southeast Asian solar New Year):
 Assamese calendar – Assam
 Bengali calendar – West Bengal
 Odia calendar – Odisha
 Tirhuta Panchang – Maithilis
 Tripuri calendar – Tripura
 Malayalam calendar – Kerala
 Tamil calendar – Tamil Nadu
 Tulu calendar – Tulus
 Vikram Samvat
 Punjabi calendar – Punjab, Haryana
 Vikrami era – North and Central India (Solar)
 Bikram Sambat – Nepal, Sikkim

Other related calendars across India and Asia
 Indian national calendar – used by Indian Government (civil calendar based on solar months)
 Vira Nirvana Samvat (Lunar) – Jain
 Nanakshahi calendar (Solar) – Sikh
 Buddhist calendar (Lunar) – Buddhist
 Tibetan calendar (Lunar) – Tibet, Ladakh, Sikkim, Arunachal Pradesh
 Pawukon calendar – Bali
 Balinese saka calendar (Lunar) – Bali
 Cham calendar (Lunar) – Chams
 Chula Sakarat (Lunar) – Myanmar
 Thai solar calendar – Thailand
 Thai lunar calendar – Thailand
 Khmer calendar (Lunar & Solar) – Cambodia

See also
 Hinduism
 Panjika
 Sankranti
 Ekadashi
 Panchangam
 Kollam era
 Hindu astrology
 Hindu units of time
 Malayalam calendar
 List of Hindu festivals
 Hindu units of measurement
 List of Hindu Empires and Dynasties
 Astronomical basis of the Hindu calendar

References

Bibliography

Further reading
 Reingold and Dershowitz, Calendrical Calculations, Millennium Edition, Cambridge University Press, latest 2nd edition 3rd printing released November 2004. 
 S. Balachandra Rao, Indian Astronomy: An Introduction, Universities Press, Hyderabad, 2000.
 Rai Bahadur Pandit Gaurishankar Hirachand Ojha, The Paleography of India, 2 ed., Ajmer, 1918, reprinted Manshuram Manoharlal publishers, 1993.

External links
 Converter: Gregorian and 1957 Normalized Indian Calendar, Shalivahana Hindu calendar, United Kingdom
 Hindu Calendar - thedivineindia.com
 Hindu Calendars Monthly - monthlycalendars.in
 Hindu Calendar of Nepal The Official Hindu Calendar of Nepal
 Kyoto University Gregorian – Saka – Vikrami Calendar Converter Tool, M. YANO and M. FUSHIMI

 
Calendar
Calendar
Articles containing video clips
Time in India
Time in Hinduism